Ralph R. Caputo (born October 31, 1940) is an American Democratic Party politician, who has served in the New Jersey General Assembly since January 8, 2008, where he represents the 28th Legislative District. He had previously served on the Essex County Board of Chosen Freeholders from 2003 to 2011 and as a Republican in the General Assembly from 1968 until 1972.

In February 2023, Caputo announced that he would leave office once he was nominated and confirmed by the Senate to serve as a director of Horizon Blue Cross Blue Shield of New Jersey.

Biography
Born and raised in Newark, Caputo graduated in 1958 from Barringer High School. Caputo received a B.A. in 1963 from Bloomfield College with a major in history and education, and was awarded a M.A. in 1975 from Seton Hall University in Educational Administration. He also attended Newark State College (now Kean University) and received a graduate certification (Supervisor) in education. After college, he began his career as an elementary school teacher in Newark. Between his stints in elected office, he was an urban education specialist for the State Department of Education, an advisor to the State Commissioner of Education, and a northern area chief for the Title 1 Office. He served as a superintendent for Essex County schools, an assistant superintendent of Essex County Vocational Technical Schools, and an associate superintendent for the Orange Board of Education. Beginning in 1983, he worked as a marketing executive for Atlantic City casinos Trump Castle Hotel and Casino, the Tropicana Casino & Resort Atlantic City, and the Showboat Atlantic City.

A long-time resident of Belleville, he is now a resident of Nutley. He is married to Celeste and has two grown children.

Political career
Caputo along with C. Richard Fiore were elected as Republicans to the State Assembly in 1967, defeating Eugene Molinaro and Warren Davis in the Republican primary and Democratic incumbents Armand Lembo and Joseph Biancardi. At the time of his election at age 27, he was the youngest person ever elected to the State Legislature. They represented Essex County's District 11-C, a new district created in 1967 following the elimination of countywide at-large Assembly districts. Caputo and Fiore were re-elected in 1969 against Democrats Carmen Orechio and Joseph Iannuzzi. During his first two terms in the Assembly, Caputo advocated for the construction of a casino in Newark. Caputo lost the backing of the Essex County Republican organization when he ran for a third term in 1971, and lost the GOP primary to Carl Orechio and John N. Dennis. He resigned his seat before his term ended effective October 4, 1971.

By 1982, Caputo had become a Democrat. That year, he ran in the Democratic primary for Essex County Executive but was defeated by incumbent Peter Shapiro and East Orange mayor Thomas H. Cooke Jr. In 2002, Caputo mounted a political comeback by running for a seat on the Essex County Board of Chosen Freeholders from District 5 consisting of Belleville, Bloomfield, Glen Ridge, Montclair, and Nutley. Running as a Democrat, he defeated incumbent Republican Freeholder Joseph P. Scarpelli. During his tenure on the Freeholder board, he reached the position of Vice President of the board. He would be re-elected to two-more three-year terms until he retired from the board in 2011 citing the difficulties of holding two elected offices serving almost two different constituencies.

In December 2005, following the death of 28th District Assemblyman Donald Kofi Tucker, Caputo sought the nomination of being appointed to the vacant seat by the local county Democratic committee. He lost the convention vote 73%-27% to Evelyn Williams. In 2007, Caputo along with Tucker's widow Cleopatra ran in the Democratic primary for the same Assembly seat. With the backing of Newark Mayor Cory Booker, Caputo and Tucker defeated incumbents Craig A. Stanley and Oadline Truitt in the primary. In the run-up to the general election, opponents used old articles from the 1960s and 70s to tie Caputo to controversial Newark activist Anthony Imperiale. Caputo stated that he never supported Imperiale's positions. Upon Caputo's win in the general election, he returned to the Assembly after a 36-year gap, the second-longest gap in the state's history.

From 2008 to 2011, Caputo simultaneously held his seat in the New Jersey General Assembly and as Freeholder. Such dual-office holding, unique to New Jersey, was allowed under a grandfather clause in the state law enacted by the New Jersey Legislature and signed into law by Governor of New Jersey Jon Corzine in September 2007 that prohibited future dual-office-holding but allowed for those who had held both positions as of February 1, 2008, to remain.

He would be easily re-elected to a fourth two-year term in 2009 but would face an unusual difficulty in 2011. After Belleville was removed from the 28th District in the 2011 legislative redistricting, Caputo moved to Nutley, New Jersey in order to seek reelection in the 28th District. The move led then-incumbent 36th District Assemblyman Kevin J. Ryan to retire from the Assembly as he too was a resident of Nutley.

Caputo draws both a pension for his career in education and another for his many years in the state legislature. At the same time, he also draws a salary as a sitting legislator. This is a legal practice in New Jersey often referred to as "double dipping."

Committees 
Committee assignments for the current session are:
Tourism, Gaming and the Arts, Chair
Education

District 28 
Each of the 40 districts in the New Jersey Legislature has one representative in the New Jersey Senate and two members in the New Jersey General Assembly. The representatives from the 28th District for the 2022—23 Legislative Session are:
 Senator Renee Burgess  (D)
 Assemblyman Ralph R. Caputo  (D)
 Assemblywoman Cleopatra Tucker  (D)

References

External links
Assemblyman Caputo's legislative webpage, New Jersey Legislature
New Jersey Legislature financial disclosure forms
2013 2012 2011 2010 2009 2008 2007 
Assembly Majority Web site

1940 births
Living people
Barringer High School alumni
Bloomfield College alumni
County commissioners in New Jersey
Democratic Party members of the New Jersey General Assembly
People from Belleville, New Jersey
People from Nutley, New Jersey
Politicians from Newark, New Jersey
Seton Hall University alumni
Kean University alumni
Republican Party members of the New Jersey General Assembly
21st-century American politicians